Valentina Margaglio (born 15 November 1993) is an Italian skeleton racer. She won a medal for Italy at the IBSF World Championships 2020, the first ever for Italy in the skeleton.

Biography
She was born to an Italian father and mother from the Ivory Coast. She has competed at a national level in both speed and strength disciplines, including the shot put and the javelin throw.

In 2011 she started competing in bobsleigh as a brakeman, participating in the 2012 Winter Youth Olympic Games in Innsbruck. Her skeleton debut for the Italian national team was in January 2016 at the European Cup, coming ninth in the overall standings at the end of the 2019/20 season.

Achievements

References

External links

1993 births
Living people
Italian female skeleton racers
Skeleton racers of Fiamme Azzurre
Italian female javelin throwers
Italian female shot putters
Italian female bobsledders
Bobsledders at the 2012 Winter Youth Olympics
Skeleton racers at the 2022 Winter Olympics
Olympic skeleton racers of Italy
Italian people of Ivorian descent